Anatoly Nikolaevich Kartashov (May 5, 1937 – January 17, 2005) was a Russian water polo player who competed for the Soviet Union in the 1960 Summer Olympics.

He was born in Moscow.

In 1960 he was a member of the Soviet team which won the silver medal in the Olympic water polo tournament. He played all seven matches and scored five goals.

See also
 List of Olympic medalists in water polo (men)

External links
 

1937 births
2005 deaths
Russian male water polo players
Soviet male water polo players
Olympic water polo players of the Soviet Union
Water polo players at the 1960 Summer Olympics
Olympic silver medalists for the Soviet Union
Olympic medalists in water polo
Sportspeople from Moscow
Medalists at the 1960 Summer Olympics